Phoebe Knapp ( Palmer; March 9, 1839 – July 10, 1908) was an American composer of music for hymns and an organist.

Biography

Knapp was born in New York City. Her parents were Walter C. Palmer and Phoebe (Worrall) Palmer. She married Joseph Fairchild Knapp, one of the founders and the second president of the Metropolitan Life Insurance Company. He had a pipe organ installed in their apartment.

She and her husband were members of the John Street Methodist Episcopal Church in New York City. The hymn writer Fanny Crosby was also a member of that church and a friend of Palmer.

She wrote over 500 hymn tunes, the most familiar being the tune now called "Assurance" for Fanny Crosby's lyrics Blessed Assurance. Another hymn by Fanny Crosby for which Knapp wrote the music is "Nearer the Cross". Other hymn tunes by Knapp include "Albertson", the tune for "Jesus Christ is Passing By" by J. Denham Smith, and for "When My Love to Christ Grows Weak" by John R. Wreford. Her tune "Consecration" has been matched to "My Spirit Soul and Body" by Mary Dagworthy James. Phoebe Palmer Knapp also wrote sacred choral and solo works, perhaps the best known of which is the Palm Sunday aria "Open the Gates of the Temple".

Knapp died in Poland, Maine.

External links

 
 The Knapps Lived Here
 MIDI files of some of her hymns at Cyber Hymnal
 Free MP3 file of Blessed Assurance at HymnsWithoutWords
 

1839 births
1908 deaths
Methodists from New York (state)
American Methodist hymnwriters
Writers from New York (state)
Composers of Christian music
19th-century American writers
19th-century American women writers
American women hymnwriters
Wikipedia articles incorporating text from A Woman of the Century
19th-century American women musicians